The Rolling Stones' 1965 2nd American Tour was a concert tour by the band. The tour commenced on October 29 and concluded on December 5, 1965. On this tour, the band supported their album Out of Our Heads.

The Rolling Stones
Mick Jagger – lead vocals, harmonica, percussion
Keith Richards – guitar, backing vocals
Brian Jones – guitar, harmonica, organ, backing vocals, percussion
Bill Wyman – bass guitar, backing vocals
Charlie Watts – drums

Tour set list
"She Said Yeah"
"Hitch Hike"
"Heart of Stone"
"Mercy, Mercy"
"That's How Strong My Love Is"
"Play With Fire"
"The Last Time"
"Good Times"
"Oh Baby"
"Get Off Of My Cloud"
"I'm Moving On"
"(I Can't Get No) Satisfaction"

Tour dates

References
 Carr, Roy.  The Rolling Stones: An Illustrated Record.  Harmony Books, 1976.  

The Rolling Stones concert tours
1965 concert tours
October 1965 events in North America
November 1965 events in the United States
December 1965 events in North America
Concert tours of Canada
Concert tours of the United States